Mauli Union is an Union Parishad under Lohagara Upazila of Narail District in the division of Khulna, Bangladesh. It has an area of 103.6 km2 (40.0 sq mi) and a population of 15,888.

References

Unions of Kalia Upazila
Unions of Narail District
Unions of Khulna Division